Frank Albanese (May 16, 1931 – October 5, 2015) was an American actor known for playing mobsters, notably on the HBO hit series The Sopranos. He also appeared in gangster films like Goodfellas. In the film The Godfather: Part III, he appeared as the Grand Marshal of the St. Gennaro Feast at the head of the street parade procession.

He was born in Staten Island, New York and died there on October 5, 2015, from prostate cancer.

Filmography

References

External links
 

1931 births
2015 deaths
Deaths from prostate cancer
American male television actors
Male actors from New York (state)
People from Staten Island
Deaths from cancer in New York (state)